The 2017–18 SHL season was the 43rd season of the Swedish Hockey League (SHL). The season began in September 2017, and the regular season ended in March 2018, to be followed by the Swedish Championship playoffs, as well as relegation playoffs. The league consisted of 14 teams. The only new addition for this season was Mora IK, who replaced Leksands IF after defeating them in the 2017 SHL qualifiers.

Regular season

Standings

Statistics

Scoring leaders 
 
List shows the ten best skaters based on the number of points during the regular season. If two or more skaters are tied (i.e. same number of points, goals and played games), all of the tied skaters are shown.

GP = Games played; G = Goals; A = Assists; Pts = Points; +/– = Plus/minus; PIM = Penalty minutes

Leading goaltenders 
These are the leaders in GAA among goaltenders who played at least 40% of the team's minutes. The table is sorted by GAA, and the criteria for inclusion are bolded.

GP = Games played; TOI = Time on ice (minutes); GA = Goals against; SO = Shutouts; Sv% = Save percentage; GAA = Goals against average

Playoffs
Ten teams qualify for the playoffs. Teams 1–6 have a bye to the quarterfinals, while teams 7–10 meet each other in a preliminary playoff round.

Playoff bracket 
In the first round the 7th-ranked team will meet the 10th-ranked team and the 8th-ranked team will meet the 9th-ranked team for a place in the second round. In the second round, the top-ranked team will meet the lowest-ranked winner of the first round, the 2nd-ranked team will face the other winner of the first round, the 3rd-ranked team will face the 6th-ranked team, and the 4th-ranked team will face the 5th-ranked team. In the third round, the highest remaining seed is matched against the lowest remaining seed. In each round the higher-seeded team is awarded home advantage. In the first round the meetings are played as best-of-three series and the rest is best-of-seven series that follows an alternating home team format: the higher-seeded team will play at home for games 1 and 3 (plus 5 and 7 if necessary), and the lower-seeded team will be at home for game 2 and 4 (plus 6 if necessary).

Round of 16 
The teams ranked 7 and 10, and the teams ranked 8 and 9, respectively, will face each other in a best-of-three series in order to qualify for the quarter-finals. The better-ranked teams in the two series will receive home advantage, i.e. two home games, if necessary. The two winners will take the two remaining quarter-final spots.

(7) Luleå HF vs. (10) Brynäs IF

(8) HV71 vs. (9) Linköpings HC

Quarter-finals

(1) Växjö Lakers vs. (10) Brynäs IF

(2) Djurgårdens IF vs. (9) Linköpings HC

(3) Frölunda HC vs. (6) Malmö Redhawks

(4) Färjestad BK vs. (5) Skellefteå AIK

Semi-finals

(1) Växjö Lakers vs. (6) Malmö Redhawks

(2) Djurgårdens IF vs. (5) Skellefteå AIK 

 Note: Game 5 was played at the Ericsson Globe.

Finals

(1) Växjö Lakers vs. (5) Skellefteå AIK

Statistics

Playoff scoring leaders 
List shows the ten best skaters based on the number of points during the playoffs. If two or more skaters are tied (i.e. same number of points, goals and played games), all of the tied skaters are shown. Updated as of April 22, 2018.
 
GP = Games played; G = Goals; A = Assists; Pts = Points; +/– = Plus/minus; PIM = Penalty minutes

Playoff leading goaltenders 
These are the leaders in GAA and save percentage among goaltenders who played at least 40% of the team's minutes. The table is sorted by GAA, and the criteria for inclusion are bolded. Updated as of April 22, 2018.

GP = Games played; TOI = Time on ice (minutes); GA = Goals against; SO = Shutouts; Sv% = Save percentage; GAA = Goals against average

SHL awards

References

2017-18
SHL